Newport News Shipbuilding (NNS), a division of Huntington Ingalls Industries, is the largest industrial employer in Virginia, and sole designer, builder, and refueler of aircraft carriers and one of two providers of submarines for the United States Navy. Founded as the Chesapeake Dry Dock and Construction Co. in 1886, Newport News Shipbuilding has built more than 800 ships, including both naval and commercial ships.

The shipyard is a major employer, not only for the lower Virginia Peninsula, but also portions of Hampton Roads south of the James River and the harbor, portions of the Middle Peninsula region, and even some northeastern counties of North Carolina.

In 2013, Newport News Shipbuilding began the deactivation of the first nuclear-powered aircraft carrier, which it also built.

Newport News Shipbuilding also performs refueling and complex overhaul (RCOH) work on s. This is a four-year vessel renewal program that not only involves refueling of the vessel's nuclear reactors but also includes modernization work. The yard has completed RCOH for five Nimitz-class carriers (and ). As of November 2017 this work was underway for the sixth Nimitz-class vessel, .

History

Industrialist Collis P. Huntington (1821–1900) provided crucial funding to complete the Chesapeake and Ohio Railroad (C&O) from Richmond, Virginia, to the Ohio River in the early 1870s. Although originally built for general commerce, this C&O rail link to the midwest was soon also being used to transport bituminous coal from the previously isolated coalfields, adjacent to the New River and the Kanawha River in West Virginia. In 1881, the Peninsula Extension of the C&O was built from Richmond down the Virginia Peninsula to reach a new coal pier on Hampton Roads in Warwick County near the small unincorporated community of Newport News Point. However, building the railroad and coal pier was only the first part of Huntington's dreams for Newport News.

The shipyard's early years

In 1886, Huntington built a shipyard to repair ships servicing this transportation hub. In 1891 Newport News Shipbuilding and Drydock Company delivered its first ship, the tugboat Dorothy.

When Collis died in 1900, his nephew Henry E. Huntington inherited much of his uncle's fortune. He also married Collis' widow Arabella Huntington, and assumed Collis' leadership role with Newport News Shipbuilding and Drydock Company. Under Henry Huntington's leadership, growth continued.

In 1906 the revolutionary  launched a great naval race worldwide. All but the first were in active service in World War II. In 1907 President Theodore Roosevelt sent the Great White Fleet on its round-the-world voyage. NNS had built seven of its 16 battleships.

In 1914 NNS built SS Medina for the Mallory Steamship Company; as  she was until 2009 the world's oldest active ocean-faring passenger ship.

Newport News and the shipyard

In the early years, leaders of the Newport News community and those of the shipyard were virtually interchangeable. Shipyard president Walter A. Post served from March 9, 1911, to February 12, 1912, when he died. Earlier, he had come to the area as one of the builders of the C&O Railway's terminals, and had served as the first mayor of Newport News after it became an independent city in 1896. It was on March 14, 1914, that Albert Lloyd Hopkins, a young New Yorker trained in engineering, succeeded Post as president of the company. In May 1915 while traveling to England on shipyard business aboard , Albert L. Hopkins tenure and life ended prematurely when that ship was torpedoed and sunk by a German U-boat off Queenstown on the Irish coast. His assistant, Frederic Gauntlett, was also on board, but was able to swim to safety. Homer Lenoir Ferguson was company vice president when Hopkins died, and assumed the presidency the following August. He saw the company through both world wars, became a noted community leader, and was a co-founder of the Mariners' Museum with Archer Huntington. He served until July 31, 1946, after World War II had ended on both the European and Pacific fronts.

Just northwest of the shipyard, Hilton Village, one of the first planned communities in the country, was built by the federal government to house shipyard workers in 1918. The planners met with the wives of shipyard workers. Based on their input 14 house plans were designed for the projected 500 English-village-style homes. After the war, in 1922, Henry Huntington acquired it from the government, and helped facilitate the sale of the homes to shipyard employees and other local residents. Three streets there were named after Post, Hopkins, and Ferguson.

Navy orders during and after World War I

Ocean liners
After World War I NNS completed a major reconditioning and refurbishment of the ocean liner . Before the war she had been the German liner Vaterland, but the start of hostilities found her laid up in New York Harbor and she had been seized by the US Government in 1917 and converted into a troopship. War duty and age meant that all wiring, plumbing, and interior layouts were stripped and redesigned while her hull was strengthened and her boilers converted from coal to oil while being refurbished. Virtually a new ship emerged from NNS in 1923, and SS Leviathan became the flagship of United States Lines.

In 1927 NNS launched the world's first significant turbo-electric ocean liner: Panama Pacific Line's  . At the time she was also the largest merchant ship yet built in the United States, although she was a modest size compared with the biggest European liners of her era. NNS launched Californias sister ships Virginia in 1928 and Pennsylvania in 1929.

Navy orders before and during World War II

By 1940 the Navy had ordered a battleship, seven more aircraft carriers and four cruisers. During World War II, NNS built ships as part of the U.S. Government's Emergency Shipbuilding Program, and swiftly filled requests for "Liberty ships" that were needed during the war. It founded the North Carolina Shipbuilding Company, an emergency yard on the banks of the Cape Fear River and launched its first Liberty ship before the end of 1941, building 243 ships in all, including 186 Libertys. For its contributions during the war, the Navy awarded the company its "E" pennant for excellence in shipbuilding. NNS ranked 23rd among United States corporations in the value of wartime production contracts.

Post-war ships
In the post-war years NNS built the famous passenger liner , which set a transatlantic speed record that still stands today. In 1954 NNS, Westinghouse and the Navy developed and built a prototype nuclear reactor for a carrier propulsion system. NNS designed  in 1960. In 1959 NNS launched its first nuclear-powered submarine, .

In the 1970s, NNS launched two of the largest tankers ever built in the western hemisphere and also constructed three liquefied natural gas carriers – at over 390,000 deadweight tons, the largest ever built in the United States. NNS and Westinghouse Electric Company jointly form Offshore Power Systems to build floating nuclear power plants for Public Service Electric and Gas Company. 
In the 1980s, NNS produced a variety of Navy products, including  nuclear aircraft carriers and  nuclear attack submarines. Since 1999 the shipyard has produced only warships for the Navy.

Submarine building problems
In 2007, the US Navy found that workers had used incorrect metal to fuse together pipes and joints on submarines under construction and this could have led to cracking and leaks.

Mergers, realignment, and spin-off
In 1968, Newport News merged with Tenneco Corporation. In 1996, Tenneco initiated a spinoff of Newport News into an independent company (Newport News Shipbuilding).  The company was purchased by Northrop Grumman in 2001 for $2.6 billion and renamed "Northrop Grumman Newport News".  This division was merged with Northrop Grumman Ship Systems in 2008 and given the name "Northrop Grumman Shipbuilding".  Three years later, the company was spun off as Huntington Ingalls Industries, Inc., which trades under the symbol HII on the New York Stock Exchange.

Presidents
Matt Mulherin
Jennifer Boykin (2017–present)

Ships built

Other ships built at the Newport News yard include:
  nuclear-powered aircraft carriers:
 , under construction
USS Doris Miller (CVN-81), under construction
 Liberty ship transports for the Allies during World War II
  nuclear-powered submarines
  nuclear-powered submarines

Gallery

Ships rebuilt 
, the first sea-going electric power plant for emergencies
, wrecked ship that was salvaged and her still-operational stern and machinery spaces rebuilt and used in the construction of a new chemical tanker, the Chemical Discoverer, later renamed Chemical Pioneer

World War II Shipbuilding Facilities

References

External links

 

Northrop Grumman
Shipbuilding companies of the United States
Companies based in Newport News, Virginia
Maritime history of Virginia
Shipyards building World War II warships
Submarine builders